XHTU-FM is a radio station on 92.3 FM in Tuxpan, Veracruz. It is owned by Radiorama and is known as La Poderosa.

History
XHTU received its concession on August 25, 1993.

External links
Radiorama Poza Rica

References

Radio stations in Veracruz